Eenhana is the capital town of the Ohangwena Region, northern Namibia, on the border with Angola. It also used to be a mission station of the Finnish Missionary Society.

Eenhana is situated in a subtropical forest. It is connected to the road network and has a well-developed infrastructure. Due to the proximity of Angola, many businesses are situated here. The town hosts an annual trade fair.

The name Eenhana comes from the word calves in Oshikwanyama and is a reference to the calves that used to water at the small water pan where Eenhana is now located.

History
Eenhana was founded around New Year's Day 1930 by the Reverend Paulus Hamutenya. He was one of the first seven Ovambos to be ordained pastors in Oniipa, Ovamboland, in 1925 by the director of the Finnish Missionary Society, Matti Tarkkanen.

Hamutenya had earlier lived in Edundja, where he had built a church. However, the area became crowded, and he decided to found a new settlement for the Oukwanyama people in the woods,  to the east of Engela. Oukwanyamas from Angola had already begun to move in that area. The South West African government made Hamutenya the local head of the tribesmen of Eastern Oukwanyama. In 1932, Hamutenya built a church in Eenhana. He died the same year after a short illness.

The Eenhana mission station was founded by the nurse Linda Helenius in 1936. Eenhana thus became the centre of medical care in Eastern Oukwanyama for several decades. Teacher Suoma Hirvonen soon joined Helenius on this new mission station.

Before Namibian independence it was a military centre of the South African Defence Force without public infrastructure. It was proclaimed a settlement in 1992, and a town in 1999.

Climate

Trade

The town attempts to attract businesses to the town through business exhibitions, small and medium enterprises and tourism activities. Eenhana hosts two annual trade fairs, The Council-run Eenhana Trade and Business Expo since 2008, and the Eenhana Annual Youth Festival, inaugurated in 2019. The Town Council is investing into marketing activities directed at investors and is assisting business development by developing open markets and providing business skills.

Education 
Eenhana is the home to six schools, three primary, one special school and two secondary:
 Eenhana Primary School
 Paulus Hamuntenya Primary School
 Haimbili Haufiku Secondary School
 Usko Nghaamwa Special School
 Eenhana Secondary School
 Nanhapo Primary School (the most recent of these schools)

Other education institutions include:
 the University of Namibia's Centre for External Studies
 Tate Institute of Technology
 Glowdom Educational Foundation
 NamCOL Centre
 Eenhana Vocational Training Centre

Politics

Eenhana is governed by a town council that has seven seats.

The 2015 local authority election was won by SWAPO which gained six seats (1,322 votes). The remaining seat was won by the Rally for Democracy and Progress (RDP) with 152 votes. SWAPO also won the 2020 local authority election. It obtained 1,182 votes and gained five seats. The Independent Patriots for Change (IPC), an opposition party formed in August 2020, obtained 402 votes and gained the remaining two seats.

References

Notes

Literature

External links
 Mass Graves 
 Pictures of airforce base and prison cells in 1988
 BBC Report

Populated places in the Ohangwena Region
Towns in Namibia
Finnish Evangelical Lutheran Mission mission stations in Oukwanyama
1930 establishments in South West Africa
Populated places established in 1930